New Brancepeth is a village in County Durham, in England. Its population is around 100–200.

It was the pit village for New Brancepeth Colliery.

Notable places
 New Brancepeth Primary School
 New Brancepeth Park
 New Brancepeth Methodist Church

References

External links

Villages in County Durham